"Edwina" was the 13th episode of the first season of the TV series M*A*S*H. It originally aired on December 24, 1972. It was written by Hal Dresner, directed by James Sheldon and guest starred Arlene Golonka in the title role.

Plot
Edwina "Eddie" Ferguson, an attractive but clumsy nurse, who often accidentally injures potential suitors, cannot find romance at the 4077th—or anywhere else, for that matter, as she confides to Margie Cutler. The other nurses at the Double Natural discuss her problem and agree to put their romantic relationships with the doctors and corpsmen on hold until someone agrees to date Eddie.

Eventually, to end the romantic drought the doctors draw straws to be her date for an evening, and Hawkeye draws the short straw. Hilarity ensues as his best smooth operator technique collides head on with Eddie's innate klutziness.

Guest cast
Arlene Golonka – Edwina Ferguson
Marcia Strassman – Margie Cutler

References

External links

M*A*S*H (season 1) episodes
1972 American television episodes